The shawm is a conical bore, double-reed woodwind instrument made in Europe from the 12th century to the present day. It achieved its peak of popularity during the medieval and Renaissance periods, after which it was gradually eclipsed by the oboe family of descendant instruments in classical music. It is likely to have come to Western Europe from the Eastern Mediterranean around the time of the Crusades. Double-reed instruments similar to the shawm were long present in Southern Europe and the East, for instance the ancient Greek, and later Byzantine, aulos, the Persian sorna, and the Armenian duduk.

The body of the shawm is usually turned from a single piece of wood, and terminates in a flared bell somewhat like that of a trumpet. Beginning in the 16th century, shawms were made in several sizes, from sopranino to great bass, and four- and five-part music could be played by a consort consisting entirely of shawms. All later shawms (excepting the smallest) have at least one key allowing a downward extension of the compass; the keywork is typically covered by a perforated wooden cover called the fontanelle. The bassoon-like double reed, made from the same arundo donax cane used for oboes and bassoons, is inserted directly into a socket at the top of the instrument, or in the larger types, on the end of a metal tube called the bocal. The pirouette, a small wooden attachment with a cavity in the center resembling a thimble, surrounds the lower part of the reed—this provides support for the lips and embouchure.

Since only a short portion of the reed protrudes past the pirouette, the player has only limited contact with the reed, and therefore limited control of dynamics. The shawm's conical bore and flaring bell, combined with the style of playing dictated by the use of a pirouette, gives the instrument a piercing, trumpet-like sound, well-suited for outdoor performances.

Etymology

In English the name first appears in the 14th century. (The name of a somewhat different reed instrument, the chalumeau, also shares this etymology.) The early plural forms were often mistaken for a singular, and new plurals were formed from them. The later reduction in the 15th and 16th centuries to a single syllable in forms such as schalme, shaume, shawme, and finally (in the 16th century) shawm, was probably due to this confusion of plural and singular forms.

However, it is also possible that the name comes from the Arabic , a traditional oboe from Egypt, as the European shawm seems to have been developed from similar instruments brought to Europe from the Near East during the time of the Crusades. This Arabic name is itself linguistically related to many other Eastern names for the instrument: the Arabic , the Turkish zūrnā, the Persian surnāy, the Chinese suona, the Javanese , and the Hindu  or sanayi.

Use

Instruments resembling the medieval shawm can still be heard in many countries today, played by street musicians or military bands. The latter use would have been familiar to crusaders, who often had to face massed bands of Saracen shawms and nakers, used as a psychological weapon. It must have had a profound effect, for the shawm was quickly adopted by Europeans, to accompany dance as well as for military purposes. The standard outdoor dance band in the fifteenth century consisted of a slide trumpet playing popular melodies, while two shawms improvised countermelodies over it. In many Asian countries, shawm technique includes circular breathing allowing continuous playing without pauses for air.

By the early 16th century the shawm had undergone considerable development. The harsh tonality of the medieval shawm had been modulated somewhat by a narrowing of the bore and a reduction in the size of the fingerholes. This also extended the range, enabling the performer to play the notes in the second octave. Larger sizes of shawm were built, down to the great bass in B, two octaves and a major third below the soprano in D. However, the larger sizes were unwieldy, which made them somewhat rare.

The smaller sizes of shawm, chiefly the soprano, alto and sometimes the tenor, were more often coupled with the Renaissance trombone, or sackbut, and the majestic sound of this ensemble was much in demand by civic authorities. The shawm became standard equipment for town bands, or waits, who were required to herald the start of municipal functions and signal the major times of day.

Before the discovery of a still shawm aboard the shipwreck of the Mary Rose, instrument historians had been puzzled by references to "still shawms", or "soft" shawms, that were said to have a sound that was less shrill than earlier shawms. The still shawm disappeared from the musical scene in the 16th century; the instrument found on the Mary Rose is the only surviving example. A reproduction has been made and played. Combined with a pipe and tabor, it provides a "very effective bass part" that would have produced "rich and full sound, which would have provided excellent music for dancing on board ship".

The shawm was reserved almost exclusively for outdoor performance—for softer, indoor music, other instruments such as the crumhorn and cornamuse were preferred. These were double reed instruments fitted with a capsule that completely enclosed the reed, which softened the sound but still did not allow for any variation in dynamics.

Known by the Spanish term chirimia, the shawm remains an important ritual instrument among Maya peoples of Highland Guatemala. Accompanied by a drum, the chirimia is frequently used in processions and in certain ritual dances, such as the Dance of the Conquest (Baile de la Conquista), and this is still played today.

Progeny of the shawm
A tenor shawm in C with a single key [without the customary lower extension to G], with a range of a perfect twelfth, was described as a nicolo according to Michael Praetorius in his Syntagma Musicum II (1619), pages 23 and 36, but was not illustrated. (The range of the bassett: nicolo descended to the A below great C and was just over four feet in length; a shawm of this range, i.e., with a conical bore, would require more than 9 feet of bore length.)

Oboe
The shawm inspired the later 17th-century hautbois, an invention of the French musician Martin Hotteterre (d. 1712). He is credited with devising essentially a brand-new instrument, one which borrowed several features from the shawm, chiefly its double reed and conical bore, but departed from it significantly in other respects, the most important departure being the fact the player places his lips directly on the reed with no intervening pirouette. Around 1670, the new French  began replacing the shawm in military bands, concert music and opera; by 1700, the shawm had all but disappeared from concert life, although as late as 1830 shawms could still be heard in German town bands performing their municipal functions. Curiously, the Germans and Dutch continued to manufacture an ornate version of the shawm, called , well after the introduction of the French . Several examples of this instrument survive in European collections, although its exact musical use is unclear.

Dulcian/bassoon
The 16th-century proclivity for building instruments in a full range of sizes was naturally extended to the shawm, but the extreme length of pipe of the bass instruments meant that few were built and played, due to their cumbersome size. A solution was devised whereby the bore was in effect "folded back" upon itself, creating a much more manageable instrument. The dulcian, like the first oboes, employed direct lip-to-reed contact, which allowed for much greater control over the sound than was offered by shawms. This led to the dulcian becoming very popular, serving as a bass both to the other shawms and even to indoor ensembles that did not feature shawms, afforded by its ability to play quietly. The dulcian was the forerunner to the bassoon, which like the oboe was a Baroque invention.

Charumera
It is sometimes used in kabuki theatre performances. It is also strongly associated in popular culture with street vendors of ramen, who played a distinctive melody on it to attract customers.

Modern performances
 Instruments of the Middle Ages and Renaissance—David Munrow and The Early Music Consort of London
 City of Lincoln Waites (The Mayor of Lincoln's own Band of Musick)
 Many recordings by Piffaro, The Renaissance Band feature shawms

See also
 Bombard, a shawm of Brittany
 Gyaling, a Tibetan shawm-type instrument
 Hirtenschalmei or "shepherd's shawm"
 Hornpipe, a similar instrument with bagpipe fingering
 Piffero, a similar instrument from Italy which is still used in Italian folk music
 Taepyeongso, a shawm-type instrument used in folk music in Korea

References

Bibliography
 Baines, Anthony. 1967. Woodwind Instruments and Their History, third edition, reprinted with corrections 1977, with a foreword by Sir Adrian Boult. London: Faber & Faber . Unaltered reprinted, New York: Dover Publications, 1991.

External links 
 
 Video of a band in Germany in Lubeck 2017 playing "shawms"; the Germans call this instrument a "Schalmei". Definitely will bring a smile to your face! 
 The Renaissance Shawm
 Dolçaina valenciana
 Shawm
 The Dulcian
 

Early musical instruments
Single oboes with conical bore
Swiss musical instruments
Double-reed instruments
Articles containing video clips